The name Optare Bonito has been used to describe two vehicles built at separate times by Optare.

Original Bonito
The original Optare Bonito is a minicoach that was built on the Ford Transit chassis. It was the last Optare coach that did not receive a face-lift.

New Bonito
The second Optare Bonito was announced on 17 January 2012. It is a small bus, according to Optare. It was launched in the UK in June 2012. The new Bonito was based on Fiat Ducato Maxi chassis. The new Bonito was constructed in partnership with Plastisol in the Netherlands.

On 4 September 2014, it was confirmed that Optare had discontinued the Bonito. The model had the unusual distinction of not achieving a single sale in the UK.

Since then Composite Mobility has continued the production from the Bonito in partnership with Plastisol, the vehicle has a new name, The CM Mission.

See also 

 List of buses

References

External links
Optare's official website

Bonito
Vehicles introduced in 2012